The A518 is a road in the Midlands, United Kingdom.

Route
It runs from Uttoxeter, Staffordshire to Telford, Shropshire via Stafford and Newport. Between Uttoxeter and Stafford it is a single carriageway, with a staggered junction with the dual carriageway A51. Entering Stafford from the east, it passes through the former Stafford Beaconside campus of Staffordshire University before hitting a roundabout with the A513, which at this point is named 'Beaconside'. It then heads into Stafford as 'Weston Road', passing around the town centre and heading out along 'Newport Road' and under the M6 motorway towards Telford.

References 

Roads in England
Telford and Wrekin
Transport in Shropshire
Transport in Staffordshire
Newport, Shropshire